Valado dos Frades is a Portuguese parish in the municipality of Nazaré. The population in 2011 was 3,109, in an area of 18.51 km².

References

Parishes of Nazaré, Portugal